Besko  (Bos’ko) is a village in Sanok County, Subcarpathian Voivodeship, in south-eastern Poland. It is the seat of the gmina (administrative district) called Gmina Besko.

The village has a population of 4 416.

History

As a result of the first of Partitions of Poland (Treaty of St-Petersburg dated 5 July 1772, the Galicia area was attributed to the Habsburg Monarchy. When a postoffice was opened in 1890, the town was in the Sanok Bezirkshauptmannschaft.

For more details, see the article Kingdom of Galicia and Lodomeria.

References

Villages in Sanok County